Banner Geovanny Caicedo Quiñónez (born March 28, 1981 in Esmeraldas) is an Ecuadorian footballer.

Career

Youth

Caicedo began his youth career with Patria in Guayaquil. In 2000, he was loaned to Huracán Sporting Club and made 11 appearances for the club before returning to Patria.

Professional

In 2003 Caicedo joined top Ecuadorean club Barcelona and quickly established himself as a fixture on defense for the club. In his four years with Barcelona he appeared in 90 league matches and scored 8 goals. In 2007, he joined Emelec and the following season played for El Nacional. The 2009 season saw Caicedo join Deportivo Quito with which he remained for two seasons appearing in 58 matches and scoring 6 goals. During the 2009 season he helped Deportivo in capturing the Serie A title. After a successful stay with Deportivo in 2011 he joined rival club LDU Quito and went on to appear in 29 matches scoring 1 goal.

On January 13, 2012, Caicedo announced that he would be joining Toronto FC and would be set to join the team during preseason, joining his countryman Joao Plata. His signing was officially announced by Toronto FC on January 26, 2012. He left Toronto FC on March 9, 2012 without playing an official game, his contract was terminated by mutual consent after having difficulty adjusting to the style of play and being away from his family.

International

Caicedo has made 9 appearances for Ecuador and was selected as part of the squad for 2011 Copa América. He was last called up in a friendly against the United States on October 11, 2011.

References

External links
Caicedo's player card

1981 births
Living people
Sportspeople from Esmeraldas, Ecuador
Ecuadorian footballers
Ecuador international footballers
2011 Copa América players
Barcelona S.C. footballers
C.S. Emelec footballers
C.D. El Nacional footballers
S.D. Quito footballers
L.D.U. Quito footballers
Toronto FC players
C.D. Cuenca footballers
Guayaquil City F.C. footballers
Fuerza Amarilla S.C. footballers
Ecuadorian expatriate footballers
Association football defenders